Priya Tandon is an Indian television and film actress.She made her debut to Indian television with Life OK's show Baawre in which she played the role of Shaheen. She also featured in Ek Tha Raja Ek Thi Rani as Swarnalekha Lakshyaraj Singh. She plays the role of Sameera in the drama series Saath Nibhaana Saathiya.

In 2016 she appeared in the Bollywood film Moh Maya Money in the role of Jiya. She had also acted in Bollywood film Wedding Anniversary.

Personal life
She married Rudra Anand in 2016.

Filmography

Films
2016: Moh Maya Money as Jiya
2017: Wedding Anniversary in a Cameo Role
2022: Dhamaka as Kripa Ved

Television
2015: Baawre as Shaheen 
2015–2016: Ek Tha Raja Ek Thi Rani as Swarnalekha Lakshyaraj Singh
2017: Tanhaiyan as Avantika 
2017: Saath Nibhaana Saathiya as Sameera
2017–2018: Naamkarann as Monica
2018: Papa By Chance as Kashvi Rathi (Kachvi)
2019–2020: Naagin: Bhagya Ka Zehreela Khel as Kanika
2021–2022: Vidrohi as Amba

References

External links

Living people
Indian film actresses
Actresses in Hindi cinema
Indian television actresses
Indian soap opera actresses
Actresses in Hindi television
Indian women television presenters
Indian television presenters
Year of birth missing (living people)
21st-century Indian actresses